Tamás Fejér (29 December 1920 – 27 June 2006) was a Hungarian film director. He directed 28 films between 1937 and 1988.

Selected filmography
 A Cozy Cottage (1963)

References

External links

1920 births
2006 deaths
Hungarian film directors
People from Pécs